Alexei Nikolaevich Litvinenko (born March 7, 1980) is a retired ice hockey defenceman. He last played for Barys Astana in the Kontinental Hockey League. He was drafted 262nd overall by the Phoenix Coyotes in the 9th round of the 1999 NHL Entry Draft.

He participated at the 2010 IIHF World Championship as a member of the Kazakhstan men's national ice hockey team.

References

External links

Alexei Litvinenko's player profile and career stats at Russian Prospects

1980 births
Sportspeople from Oskemen
Barys Nur-Sultan players
Expatriate ice hockey players in Russia
HC Dynamo Moscow players
Metallurg Magnitogorsk players
HC Spartak Moscow players
Kazakhstani ice hockey defencemen
Kazakhstani people of Russian descent
Kazzinc-Torpedo players
Living people
Arizona Coyotes draft picks
SKA Saint Petersburg players
HC Vityaz players
Asian Games gold medalists for Kazakhstan
Medalists at the 1999 Asian Winter Games
Medalists at the 2011 Asian Winter Games
Asian Games medalists in ice hockey
Ice hockey players at the 1999 Asian Winter Games
Ice hockey players at the 2011 Asian Winter Games
Kazakhstani expatriate sportspeople in Russia